is a junction passenger railway station  located in  Higashinada-ku, Kobe, Hyōgo Prefecture, Japan. It is operated by the West Japan Railway Company (JR West) and by the third sector Kobe New Transit Company

Lines

Station layout
The JR station consists of two island platforms connected by an elevated station building.  The two inside tracks are used by local and rapid service trains, and the two outside tracks by passing trains and a limited number of rapid trains. The station has a Midori no Madoguchi staffed ticket office. The Kobe New Transit station has one deadheaded island platform and is  located above the JR platforms.

Platforms

Adjacent stations

History
Sumiyoshi Station opened on 1 June 1874.  With the privatization of the Japan National Railways (JNR) on 1 April 1987, the station came under the aegis of the West Japan Railway Company. The Kobe New Transit began operations on 21 February 1991.

Station numbering was introduced to the Kobe Line platforms in March 2018 with Sumiyoshi being assigned station number JR-A57.

Passenger statistics
In fiscal 2019, the JR station was used by an average of 35,612 passengers daily, and the Kobe New Transit station was used by 13,577 people in the same period.

Surrounding area
Higashinada Ward General Government Building (Higashinada Ward Office)
Kobe Municipal Higashinada Library
Nada Junior and Senior High School
Konan Elementary School
Kobe Municipal Sumiyoshi Elementary School
Kobe Municipal Sumiyoshi Junior High School

See also
List of railway stations in Japan

References

External links 

 Sumiyoshi Station from JR-Odekake.net 
Kobe New Transit Sumiyoshi Station 

Railway stations in Japan opened in 1874
Tōkaidō Main Line
Railway stations in Kobe